Gurunath Vidyanidhi (1862–1931) was a Sanskrit scholar who was born in Vikrampur in the Dhaka District of what later became Bangladesh. He was the author of a number of books used by Sanskrit scholars and researchers, including Mugdhavodh Vyakaran, Mitralabh, Amarkos, Sahitya Darpan and Chhando Manjari.

References
 

Bengali people
1862 births
1931 deaths
People from Bikrampur
People from British India